A. Raghunath is a Malayalam film producer.

Career 
He works in the Malayalam film industry. He produced at least 16 films. His career started with Thurakkatha Vathil in 1970. his last known film is Adhyayam Onnu Muthal.

Films produced

References

Possibly living people
Year of birth missing
Malayalam film producers